Cheiloneurus paralia is a species of chalcid wasp in the family Encyrtidae. It is found in Europe.  It is a parasitoid of mealybugs.

Taxonomy 
This species was first described in 1837 by Francis Walker, within Monographia Chalciditum, and named Encyrtus paralia on the basis of a specimen collected in July from the "south of France".

Distribution 
This species has been (according to GBIF), observed in: Iran, Norway, UK, Mongolia, Sweden, Hungary, and Greece.

References 

Encyrtinae
Hymenoptera of Europe
Taxa named by Francis Walker (entomologist)